Nelse is a small rural locality in the Bogong High Plains of Victoria, Australia.

History 
Nelse was originally a cattlemen station in the late 1800s.

References 

Towns in Victoria (Australia)
Shire of East Gippsland